Yabim-Mape Rural LLG is a local-level government (LLG) of Morobe Province, Papua New Guinea.

Wards
01. Kamlawa
02. Simbang
03. Bugaim
04. Nasingalatu
05. Sokaneng
06. Kwalansam
07. Kasanga
08. Busiga
09. Wanam/Tami Island
10. Bukawasip
11. Tigidu
13. Samantiki
14. Mawaneng
15. Embewaneng
16. Mangao
17. Kangaruo
18. Haponhongdong
19. Buang
20. Gurungko
21. Yombong
22. Kolem

References

Local-level governments of Morobe Province